Dholpur is a city in the Dholpur district in Rajasthan state of India.  It is situated on the left bank of the famous Chambal river. The city is the administrative headquarters of Dholpur District and was formerly seat of the Dholpur princely state.

Dhaulpur became a separate district in 1982 comprising Dholpur, Rajakhera, Saramathura, Bari and Baseri Tehsils. Dholpur district is a part of Bharatpur Division/Commissionerate. It is bordered by Bharatpur district of Rajasthan and Uttar Pradesh to the north, Madhya Pradesh to the south, Karauli district to the west and Uttar Pradesh and Madhya Pradesh to the east.
Dhaulpur is famous for his Red Stone and ancient time temple.
Here is Machkund temple and kund which is famous as "Tirthon ka Bhanja".
Two famous shiv temple situated here 1.)Mahakaal Shiv Temple.
2.)Bhooteshwar Mahadev Temple.
Bhooteshwar Mahadev Temple situated at Baseri Block of Dhaulpur. It is situated at bank of parvati river.It is very peaceful and beautiful temple in this district. Along with Mahakaal temple is also a very famous temple because of his color changing shivling which is situated at Dhaulpur district.This Mahakaal shivling change his color three times a day.

Geography

The city of Dholpur (Dhaulpur) lies on the left (north) bank of the Chambal River at 26° 42' 0" North, 77° 54' 0" East, across the river, and provincial border, from Morena in Madhya Pradesh. It is located on old NH-3 and is a junction on the North Central Railway.

History

Rajput period
There were several Rajput dynasties including Chauhans, Tomars and Jadauns who ruled over Dholpur for long period.
 Chahmana (Chauhan) rule
The earliest Rajput dyanasty ruled Dholpur region were Chauhan's in early 7th and 8th century, The discovery of a stone inscription at Dholpur has 
brought into light the existence of a Chahamana dynasty 
at Dhavalapuri. The inscription mentions Chuahan Prince Chandamahasena who was the contemporary of rajput pratihara emperor Bhojadev. The inscription mentions conflicts of Chuahan Prince with invading Arab armies.
 Tomar rule
The rule of Dholpur region passed into the hands of Tomar Rajputs in 1004 AD, Dholpur or Dhawalpuri city was established by Rajput Raja Dholan Dev Tomar and most likely the name of city was changed to Dholpur after him. He resided 10 km southwest of Dholpur at a place called Bilpur near Chambal where a fort still exists. He was the ruler of the country between Chambal and Banganga. The Dholeshwar Mahadev Temple built by this Raja was washed away in Chambal floods of 1868 AD.
 Jadaun rule
The Tomars lost sovereignty to Jadaun rajputs of Karauli. The fort at Dholpur was built by Dharmpal Jadaun in 1120 AD.

Mughal period

After the battle of Panipat, Babar became the first Mughal ruler of Hindustan. His rule was not a bed of roses in the early years of his reign. 
Dholpur was taken by Sikandar Lodi in 1491, who handed it to a Muslim governor in 1504. After the death of Ibrahim Lodi, many states declared themselves independent. Talai Khan became the ruler of Gwalior.

Jat period 
After the Mughals, Dholpur was taken successively by the Jat ruler Maharaja Suraj Mal of Bharatpur; by Mirza Najaf Khan in 1775; by the Maratha Scindia ruler of Gwalior in 1782; and finally, by the British East India Company in 1803. It was restored by the British to the Scindias under the Treaty of Sarji Anjangaon, briefly, and was soon reoccupied by the British. In 1805, Dhaulpur came under the Jat ruler, Maharana Kirat Singh of Gohad, a princely state, a vassal of the British during the Raj.

According to the Babur Nama, Babur had a baori built in Dholpur on his last trip to Gwalior, to add to the charghar ("four-gardens") he had already had built there.

British rule and after
During British Raj, it was part of the Rajputana Agency, till the Independence of India. The former mansion of the ruler of the erstwhile Dholpur State, Kesarbagh palace, now houses the Dholpur Military School, while its official residence in New Delhi, Dholpur House, is used by the Union Public Service Commission.

Demographics

 2021 census, Dhaulpur municipality had a population of 246,489.

 2011 census, Dhaulpur municipality had a population of 126,142 and the urban agglomeration had a population of 133,229. The municipality had a sex ratio of 862 females per 1,000 males and 13.6% of the population were under six years old. Effective literacy was 76.56%; male literacy was 84.22% and female literacy was 67.74%.

The local language is Brajbhasha. Dholpur is home to Hindu, Muslim and Jain communities.

Education
Dholpur Military School is housed in Kesarbagh Palace, a magnificent mansion of the former ruler of the erstwhile Dholpur State. It is 10.5 kilometers away from Dholpur City and on Dholpur-Bari Road.

Govt PG College is located two kilometers away from the city towards the railway station. The only PG college in Dholpur city was established four decades ago after independence. Notable alumni include DP Sharma, International Digital Diplomat and National Brand Ambassador, Swachh Bharat Mission, India, and Manoj Rajoria, Member of Parliament, Republic of India.

Climate
Dholpur is reputed to be the location of the highest recorded temperature in India, at 50 °C on 3 June 2017. The hottest months are May and June, which mark the oppressive summer season. Temperatures in summers are normally higher than 40 °C. Coldest months are December and January where temperatures sometimes reach near-zero and subzero levels. The lowest recorded temperature is -4.3 °C on 29 January 2017. Annual average rainfall is 860 mm.

See also
Dholpur–Sarmathura Railway
Dholpur State

References

External links

 

Cities and towns in Dholpur district
Populated places established in the 1st millennium